Dracula's Dog (U.K. title: Zoltan... Hound of Dracula; original working title: Hounds of Dracula) is a 1977 American horror film starring Michael Pataki and José Ferrer. It revolves around a dog who is turned into a vampire by a member of the Dracula family, who is also a vampire.

The film's screenplay by Frank Ray Perilli was the basis for the mass market paperback novel Hounds of Dracula (1977) by Ken Johnson, which was re-titled Dracula's Dog upon the film's release in the United States. In the United Kingdom, the novel was titled Zoltan...Hound of Dracula.

Plot
The Romanian army accidentally blasts open a subterranean crypt, and the army captain, fearing looters and criminals, stations a guard near the site. Late in the night, an earthquake shakes loose one of the coffins, which slides down and lands at the feet of the confused guard. Curious as to what has fallen before him, the guard opens the coffin and discovers a dog's body, impaled by a wooden stake. He removes the stake, which revives the vampiric Doberman Pinscher Zoltan.

After slaying the guard and drinking his blood, Zoltan opens another coffin shaken loose from the crypt, this one holding the body of his master, an innkeeper named Veidt Smit. The crypt belongs to the Dracula family, all of whom are vampires. Zoltan removes the stake from the innkeeper's chest, re-animating him. The narrative then cuts to a flashback of a village in Romania in 1670, over 300 years ago.

The dog of an innkeeper saves a sleeping woman from being bitten by Count Igor Dracula. Furious over losing his victim to a dog, Dracula, in bat form, bites the dog, turning it into a vampire. Then Dracula, with the dog by his side, turns on the innkeeper, turning him into a "fractional lamia" (an undead creature that is only part vampire, able to function in the daytime and having no need to drink blood) who can be used as a slave.

Back in the present day, it appears that the Dracula family have only one surviving (mortal) descendant, Michael Drake, a psychiatrist, and (unknown to him) the image of Count Igor Dracula. He decides to take his wife (Marla) and their two children (Linda and Steve), as well as their two German Shepherd Dogs (Samson and Annie) and their two puppies, on vacation in the family's Winnebago camper.

The vampire dog and his master travel to the United States, shipping themselves via boat to Los Angeles, California to make Michael their new master. Eventually, Zoltan and Smit find themselves in the same forest as Michael and his family.

Two fishermen, vacationing nearby with a Pointer called Buster, discover that Zoltan has bitten their dog. The Drakes' two dogs are also bitten and all the deceased dogs reanimate into vampire dogs, the minions of Zoltan. Veidt Smit and the four vampire dogs are all destroyed at the end of the film but, unknown to everyone involved, a vampire German Shepherd puppy (one of the two puppies belonging to the Drakes) that Zoltan had bitten previously, escapes destruction.

Cast
 Michael Pataki as Michael Drake/Count Igor Dracula
 José Ferrer as Inspector Vaclav Branco
 Reggie Nalder as Veidt Smit
 Jan Shutan as Marla Drake
 Libby Chase as Linda Drake
 John Levin as Steve Drake
 Cleo Harington as Pat Parks
 Arlene Martel as Major Hessel
 Tom Gerrard as Maslow, the guard
 Dimitri Logothetis as an army corporal
 Al Ferrara as Al, the deputy
 Roger Pancake as the sheriff

Release
Thorn EMI/HBO and United Home Video released it on VHS as Zoltan... Hound of Dracula and Dracula's Dog, respectively.  Anchor Bay Entertainment released it on DVD as Zoltan... Hound of Dracula on August 20, 2002.

Reception
Rotten Tomatoes reports 17% of six surveyed critics gave the film a positive review; the average rating is 3.6/10.  Michael Wilmington of the Los Angeles Times called it the nadir of vampire films.TV Guide rated it 1/5 stars and called the film's premise "ludicrous". Adam Tyner of DVD Talk rated it 2/5 stars and wrote that the film is too inept to be scary, though it is fun to mock.  Writing in The Encyclopedia of Fantasy, John Clute and John Grant call it "surprisingly dull", but complimented the dogs. Welch Everman wrote in Cult Horror Movies that the film "could have been a pretty effective and frightening movie", but failed to live up to its potential.

See also
 List of vampire films

References

External links
 

1977 films
1977 horror films
Fiction set in 1670
American supernatural horror films
American vampire films
Dracula films
Films about dogs
Crown International Pictures films
Films directed by Albert Band
1970s supernatural horror films
Films set in the 1670s
Films set in 1977
Films set in Los Angeles
Films set in Romania
1970s English-language films
1970s American films